Charles Frederick Seelbach (born March 20, 1948) is a former right-handed pitcher in Major League Baseball. He played for the Detroit Tigers between 1971 and 1974.

Amateur career
In 1967, Seelbach played collegiate summer baseball with the Orleans Cardinals of the Cape Cod Baseball League, where he was named a league all-star and tossed a no-hitter against a Chatham team that included Thurman Munson. He played baseball at Dartmouth College from 1968 to 1970 and still ranks among Dartmouth's all-time leaders in winning percentage (.688), strikeouts (162), and shutouts (3).

Professional career

In 1972, Seelbach had a 9–8 record with a 2.89 ERA and was among the American League leaders with 61 games (7th in the AL), 14 saves (7th in the AL), and 34 games finished (9th in the AL).  On April 20, 1972, Seelbach combined with Tom Timmermann for a two-hitter but lost to the Baltimore Orioles, 1–0, on a home run by Paul Blair.

Seelbach was also on the mound when the Tigers clinched the American League East championship on October 3, 1972.  Seelbach set down the Boston Red Sox 1-2-3 in the 9th inning to clinch the AL East title, as the game ended on a Ben Oglivie fly ball caught by Al Kaline in right field.

Seelbach pitched in two games of the 1972 American League Championship Series, allowing four hits and two runs for an 18.00 post-season earned run average. A shoulder injury the next year ended his appearance in the league.

Personal life
For over thirty-nine years, Seelbach was a European and American History teacher at his high school alma mater, University School, a preparatory school for boys in Hunting Valley, Ohio, a suburb of Cleveland. He retired from University School in May 2014 as one of the longest tenured educators in the School's history.

Seelbach is the father of Charles "Cory" Seelbach and Broadway actor Michael Seelbach.

References

External links
 Official Chuck Seelbach Stats, Bio, Photos, Highlights on MLB.com
 Chuck Seelbach records on BaseballLibrary.com

1948 births
Living people
Detroit Tigers players
Baseball players from Ohio
Major League Baseball pitchers
Dartmouth College alumni
Orleans Firebirds players
Sportspeople from Lakewood, Ohio
University School alumni
Sportspeople from Cuyahoga County, Ohio